The 1893 Brown Bears football team represented Brown University as an independent in the 1893 college football season. Led by William Odlin in his first and only season as head coach, Brown compiled a record of 6–3.

Schedule

References

Brown
Brown Bears football seasons
Brown Bears football